Radical 51 or radical dry meaning "" or "" is one of 31 out of the total 214 Kangxi radicals written with three strokes.

There are only nine characters derived from this radical, and some modern dictionaries have discontinued its use as a section header. In such characters that comprise 干 as a component, it mostly takes a purely phonetic role, as in  "liver" (which falls under radical 130 肉 "meat").

 is also the 27st indexing component in the Table of Indexing Chinese Character Components predominantly adopted by Simplified Chinese dictionaries published in mainland China.

Evolution

In origin, the character may depict either a pestle or a shield. It can be traced to the seal script.

Derived characters

In simplified Chinese
As a character (not a radical),  has risen to new importance, and even notoriety due to the 20th-century Chinese writing reform.

The high frequency and polysemy of the character poses a serious problem for Chinese translation software.

Literature 

Leyi Li: “Tracing the Roots of Chinese Characters: 500 Cases”. Beijing 1993, 
Rick Harbaugh, Chinese Characters: A Genealogy and Dictionary, Yale University Press (1998), .

See also
Fuck#Machine mistranslation

References

External links

Unihan Database - U+5E72

051
027